Diego Fernando Valdés Parra (born August 13, 1981) is a retired Colombian footballer who played as a defender and central midfielder from 2000 until 2015. He has represented Colombia at under-21 and under-23 level. He currently plays for Depor F.C.

His former clubs at professional level include Deportivo Cali, Deportivo Pasto and Independiente Medellín in his native Colombia, Atlético Venezuela and Estudiantes de Mérida from Venezuela and Blooming of the Liga de Fútbol Profesional Boliviano. His younger brother is football defender Carlos Valdés, who plays for the Philadelphia Union in the MLS.

References

External links
 

1981 births
Living people
Footballers from Cali
Colombian footballers
Colombia under-20 international footballers
Estudiantes de Mérida players
Deportivo Cali footballers
Deportivo Pasto footballers
Independiente Medellín footballers
Club Blooming players
Atlético Venezuela C.F. players
Cúcuta Deportivo footballers
Atlético F.C. footballers
Colombian expatriate footballers
Colombian expatriate sportspeople in Bolivia
Colombian expatriate sportspeople in Venezuela
Expatriate footballers in Bolivia
Expatriate footballers in Venezuela
Association football midfielders